The West Virginia Roughriders are a professional indoor football team based in Wheeling, West Virginia. They were founded in 2016 as the Richmond Roughriders and played at the Richmond Coliseum in 2017 and 2018.

They were members the Arena Pro Football (APF) league in 2017. The Roughriders initially announced they were joining the National Arena League (NAL) for the 2018 season but then later joined the American Arena League (AAL). After the one season in the AAL, the owner announced he was creating his own league, Professional Arena Football, and left the AAL but the new league never gained traction and the team returned to the AAL. Concurrently, the Roughriders also moved to Wheeling due to arena issues in Richmond. They again announced they were not returning to the AAL for the 2020 season and joined the NAL two years after initially backing out. However, the 2020 season was cancelled due to the effects of the COVID-19 pandemic, the team opted to go dormant for the 2021 season, and then left the NAL prior to the 2022 season.

History

Richmond Roughriders (2017–2018)
The Roughriders were first formed in October 2016 as members of Arena Pro Football's inaugural season. The team would go undefeated in the 2017 season in the unstable APF. The Roughriders defeated the Florida Tarpons 71–61 to capture the APF's only championship.

At the end of the first season, the APF was announced to have merged with the Can-Am Indoor Football League for the 2018 season to create the American Arena League (AAL). The new league initially announced the Roughriders as members in the league, but ownership claimed they were still exploring their options and never committed to the AAL. On July 20, 2017, the National Arena League announced it had conditionally approved a team from Richmond as members for the 2018 season with the Roughriders confirming that they were finalizing their NAL expansion requirements. However, on September 13, 2017, the team announced that they were instead joining the American Arena League citing that the AAL would be a better fit for them.

In December 2017, rapper Jim Jones became part owner of the team along with the original owners Gregg Fornario and Mike Kacor. Jones immediately made the news by publicly offering the then-currently unemployed and controversial former NFL quarterbacks Colin Kaepernick and Johnny Manziel a position on the team.  On January 26, 2018, the team announced the signing of controversial former NFL defensive lineman Greg Hardy. The signing gained significant media attention, mostly criticizing the move in response the on-going Me Too movement, heightened attention to the treatment of women, and Hardy's 2014 domestic violence charge.

In the 2018 season, the Roughriders continued to have success and went 7–1 for the season and first-place finish, only losing to the Georgia Doom. After the Atlanta Havoc lost their final game of the season, also to the Doom, the Roughriders earned home field advantage for the playoffs. They defeated the Carolina Energy 57–43 in a semifinal game before facing the Havoc. The Roughriders led the game through the first half, but the Havoc came back to win the inaugural AAL championship game 58–50. After the end of the season, the Roughriders home, the Richmond Coliseum, was scheduled for demolition and to be replaced by a new venue. The team claimed any new arena would be priced out of their affordability and the Roughriders could not return to Richmond for a 2019 season. Majority owner and general manager Gregg Fornario stated they were looking into venues in Hershey, Reading, and Wilkes-Barre in Pennsylvania, Norfolk in Virginia, and Atlantic City in New Jersey.

West Virginia Roughriders (2019–2021)
On August 15, 2018, Roughriders' owner Gregg Fornario announced his intentions of creating a new league called Northern Arena Football (NAF). His Roughriders team was not initially planning on leaving the AAL with the NAF only having teams north of the Maryland-Pennsylvania border. However, by August 28, Fornario had rebranded the new league as Professional Arena Football (PAF) with multiple divisions, Northern Arena Football and Southern Arena Football, and the Roughriders were announced as part of Professional Arena Football on August 30, leaving the AAL.  The league was also announced to have the New England Cavalry and Marion Mambas as members. By November 2018, no new teams had been accepted by the PAF and Fornario decided to not launch the league in 2019.

After the loss of the Richmond Coliseum, the Roughriders also settled on a lease to use WesBanco Arena in Wheeling, West Virginia, becoming the West Virginia Roughriders. However, Fornario's plans to launch the new league fell through and the team rejoined the AAL for the 2019 season as part of a new Northern Division. The Northern Division consisted of the Burgh Defenders, Jersey Flight, and New England Bobcats. The Flight nearly folded at the start of the season and delayed their season starting date, the Bobcats folded midseason, and the Defenders lost their arena, leading to the Roughriders playing eight of their ten games at home. The team then went undefeated for a 10–0 record and eight wins against AAL opponents. They defeated the Flight in the divisional playoff championship before facing the West Michigan Ironmen, the Midwest Division champion. The Roughriders then advanced to their third straight league championship game, again at home, and beat the Carolina Energy 55–29 to win their first AAL championship.

Following the season, Fornario again announced he was removing the Roughriders from the AAL due to differences with league operations. On October 24, 2019, the Roughriders were official added to the National Arena League (NAL), two years after Fornario had decided to join the AAL instead of the NAL. The 2020 NAL was then cancelled due to the COVID-19 pandemic and head coach Mook Zimmerman decided to retire in August 2020. At the end of the month, team owner Fornario announced the team was for sale. On October 30, 2020, the NAL announced the Roughriders would be dormant for at least the 2021 season. By December 2020, Fornario signed an agreement to sell the franchise to HMG Sports, the group that attempted to launch the Baltimore Lightning in the NAL for the 2021 season before having their membership terminated three weeks later for not providing a letter of credit and an arena lease. The sale apparently never completed.

In October 2021, Fornario stated that he was disputing terms of the team's membership contract with the NAL. The Roughriders then stated they will not return to the NAL and will look into other options. Fornario tweeted that he was in discussions with selling the team to the ownership group that operated the NAL's Albany Empire led by Ron Trideco to keep the team in the NAL, but were eventually removed from the list of 2022 NAL teams and were not included in the schedule. On January 12, 2022, The team announced on their Facebook page that, due to renovations to WesBanco Arena that would force the closure of the venue from June 1st to September 1, the Roughriders would not be playing the 2022 season and options to buy the team were put on hold.  On October 24, 2022, head coach Mook Zimmerman signed with the IFL's Massachusetts Pirates as a linebackers and defensive lineman coach.

Statistics

Season-by-season results
As of the 2019 season:

2017 APF season

2018 AAL season

2019 AAL season

References

External links
 Official website

American football teams in West Virginia
Sports in Wheeling, West Virginia
American football teams established in 2019
2019 establishments in West Virginia
National Arena League teams